is a Japanese actress and singer. Her mother is the singer Mari Henmi.

Emiri Henmi shares a name with Japanese-Montenegrin rhythm guitarist of English/Canadian band The Revolving Doors of London, Emiri Fujita and Japanese voice actress and singer, Emiri Katō.

Filmography

Dubbing
Blow, Mirtha Jung (Penélope Cruz)

External links

Profile at JMDb (in Japanese)

References

1976 births
Living people
Actresses from Tokyo
21st-century Japanese singers